The Mauritius dragonet (Callionymus mascarenus) is a species of dragonet endemic to the Indian Ocean waters around Mauritius.  This species grows to a length of  SL.

References 

M
Fish described in 1983
Taxa named by Ronald Fricke
Endemic fauna of Mauritius